Rudník (until 1952 Heřmanovy Sejfy) is a municipality and village in Trutnov District in the Hradec Králové Region of the Czech Republic. It has about 2,000 inhabitants.

Administrative parts
Villages of Arnultovice and Javorník are administrative parts of Rudník.

Geography
It lies in the Giant Mountains Foothills. The village lies at the confluence of the streams Luční and Bolkovský.

History
The first written mention of Rudník is from 1354. It was founded during the colonization of the Giant Mountains in the 13th century by German immigrants who mined ore here. The most notable owners of the village were the Waldstein family, who held it from 1521 to 1706. They further developed the mining and processing of ores, and contributed to the building development of the village.

The next owners were a branch of the House of Schwarzenberg, who merged it with the Vlčice estate. In 1790, the estate was bought by the Barons Theers of Silberstein, who had the castle and stone school building built in the village. They sold the village to the Klug family in 1880. The Klugs established here a bleaching plant, a dyeing plant and a mechanical weaving plant.

Sights
The Rudník Castle, also called Silbersteins' Castle, was built for Josef Karel Theer of Silberstein in the 1830s. In 1858, it was rebuilt in the neo-Gothic style. Today it serves as a hotel.

References

External links

 

Villages in Trutnov District